The John Smith House is a historic building located at 124 Washington Valley Road in the Washington Valley section of Morris Township, Morris County, New Jersey. The two-story brick house was built in 1812, with the year set in black brick on the west gable. It was added to the National Register of Historic Places on January 1, 1976, for its significance in agriculture and architecture. It is also a contributing property of the Washington Valley Historic District.

See also
National Register of Historic Places listings in Morris County, New Jersey

References

External links
 
 

National Register of Historic Places in Morris County, New Jersey
Houses on the National Register of Historic Places in New Jersey
Historic district contributing properties in Morris County, New Jersey
Individually listed contributing properties to historic districts on the National Register in New Jersey
New Jersey Register of Historic Places
1812 establishments in New Jersey
Morris Township, New Jersey
Brick buildings and structures
Historic American Buildings Survey in New Jersey